Salvador Villegas Jr. (born December 4, 2001) is an American professional soccer player who plays as a midfielder for USL Championship side Portland Timbers 2.

Club career
Born in Hamilton City, California, Villegas began his career in the youth teams of Major League Soccer side Portland Timbers. On March 8, 2020, Villegas was called-up to the Portland Timbers 2, the Timbers' reserve side in the USL Championship, and was an unused substitute for their match against Phoenix Rising. Then, on July 18, 2020, Villegas made his professional debut for Timbers 2 against the Tacoma Defiance. He came on as a 67th minute substitute as Timbers 2 were defeated 3–0.

Career statistics

Club

References

External links
Profile at the USL Championship website

2001 births
Living people
People from Glenn County, California
American soccer players
Association football midfielders
Portland Timbers 2 players
USL Championship players
Soccer players from California